Section Beams are made of steel and they have a specific lengths and shapes like -beam, -channel and I flanged beam.  These types of section are usually used in steel structures and it is common to connect them with plates of steel.

Joints 
There are three connection types:

 Rivets
 Bolts
 Welding

Rivets are the strongest and most common type.

Safety 
There are some calculation methods to determine whether the design and construction of the truss is safe.

References 

Structural system